Haunt is a 2013 American supernatural horror film directed by Mac Carter in his feature film directorial debut. The film premiered at the Film Society of Lincoln Center on November 6, 2013, and was later released on video on demand on February 7, 2014. Haunt stars Harrison Gilbertson as a teenager who moves into a new house and goes through not only a sexual awakening but also a terrifying haunting.

Plot
A distraught man, Franklin, tries to speak to his dead children in the afterlife by using an EVP box; soon thereafter, he is mysteriously possessed by a ghost, which then apparently causes him to kill himself.

After this incident, a woman who will come to be known to the viewer as Dr. Morello begins narrating about her family and how they were murdered one by one by an unknown force.
When Evan Asher (Harrison Gilbertson) and his family move into the old Morello house some years later, they are largely unaware that it has a history of death and grief. After having difficulties sleeping, Evan goes for a walk where he meets Samantha Richards (Liana Liberato) crying as a result of her drunk, abusive father. They say goodbye but she sneaks into his bed that same night.  Soon after their arrival Evan begins to experience paranormal activity and enlists Samantha's help to uncover what is going on.

As the two teens spend more and more time with each other, they begin to fall in love and in the course of exploring the house, find the same EVP box from before. Not really expecting anything to actually happen, they use it to speak with the dead and it starts working. The ghosts continue haunting the two teens as well as psychically contacting the youngest child (leaving the parents unaware of the whole situation), and at the urging of Dr. Morello, whom they deduce might know something about the hauntings, the frightened Evan and Sam decide to burn the box and the belongings of the previous owners. They also seal the small room in their attic bedroom where the box was found. However, these actions fail to work as hoped and the ghost of a woman haunts them that night and locks the door.
 
It is then revealed to Sam in a psychic vision that the ghost is vengeful. Frank Morello had an affair with a woman who was his neighbor and his wife's patient. This woman gave birth to a daughter revealed to be Samantha. Doctor Morello finds out about the affair and brutally kills the woman while the weak-willed Frank stands by and watches, holding the daughter he sired. The woman is then buried in a small room in the attic, where Evan is staying now. Sam is then possessed by her mother's spirit who in turn kills Evan by bludgeoning him with a hammer saying "You shouldn't have burned the box, you shouldn't have closed the room."

Sam is caught by Evan's father when she tries to open the wooden plank in the floor under which the woman's body is buried, calling out "Mommy" the whole time. She is arrested and taken away by the cops. The movie ends with the voice of Dr. Morello wondering if Evan will haunt that house forever like she believes the members of her family will.

Cast

 Harrison Gilbertson as Evan Asher
 Liana Liberato as Samantha "Sam" Richards
 Jacki Weaver as Janet Morello
 Ione Skye as Emily Asher
 Brian Wimmer as Alan Asher
 Danielle Chuchran as Sara Asher
 Ella Harris as Anita Asher
 Carl Hadra as Franklin Morello
 Jan Broberg Felt as Meredith
 Kelly Noonan as Real Estate Agent
 Aline Andrade as Young Woman
 Jarrod Phillips as Man
 DeVille Vannik as Police Officer (as Devill Vannick)
 Maggie Scott as Youngest Morello Daughter
 Brenden Whitney as EMT
 Sebastian Michael Barr as Matthew Morello
 Kasia Kowalczyk as Demon Creature

Production
Plans to film Haunt were officially announced in August 2012, with Mac Carter set to direct a script written by Andrew Barrer. Production and filming for the movie was set to begin in Utah in November 2012, and Jacki Weaver was confirmed to be performing in Haunt. In early 2013 QED International launched a viral website that detailed the fictional Morello House, portraying it as a real paranormal case study.

Reception
Fearnet gave Haunt a mostly positive review, noting that while the film's story "won't win many awards for originality", that Haunt did bring in some new ideas and that overall "it's a respectably old-school chiller that feels sort of refreshing after watching so many high-tech, post-modern, and uber-subversive horror flicks." We Got This Covered also commented on the film's familiarity to similarly-themed haunted house films, but praised Carter's directing as they felt that it helped keep it from becoming "another genre copy with a ghost, a story, and absolutely no intrigue." In contrast, Shock Till You Drop gave the film a more mixed review, commenting that it was "competently made" but that "no matter how well-made it is, you have seen every minute of this movie before".

References

External links
 
 
 

2013 films
2013 horror films
2010s ghost films
2010s mystery horror films
2010s supernatural horror films
American ghost films
American haunted house films
American mystery horror films
American supernatural horror films
2013 directorial debut films
2010s English-language films
Films about families
Films scored by Reinhold Heil
Films shot in Utah
QED International films
Films produced by Bill Block
2010s American films